Melbourne Square is an enclosed shopping mall in Melbourne, Florida. Opened in 1982, it is anchored by two Dillard's stores, J. C. Penney, Macy's, and Dick's Sporting Goods.

History
The mall was built on what had formerly been an orange grove. It was the second mall in Melbourne, after Brevard Mall in 1962.

The first store to open at Melbourne Square in 1982 was Ivey's. The other anchors that opened later are Jordan Marsh, Burdine's, JCPenney, and Belk.

In 1990, Ivey's became the mall's first Dillard's. Jordan Marsh closed in 1992 and became the first Florida location for Mervyn's the same year. The Mervyn's store closed and became a second Dillard's in 1997. The mall is currently managed by Washington Prime Group.

In 2003, Macy's took over the mall's Burdine's store, which became Burdines-Macy's until 2005 when it became Macy's. Belk moved to The Avenue in Viera in 2004. The former Belk building was torn down in 2006 for Dick's Sporting Goods and Circuit City, the latter of which went out of business in 2009. The former Circuit City space operated as a World Of Decor store before becoming LA Fitness in 2014, with H&M joining the same year.

An annual Hanukkah menorah parade takes place near the mall in association with the local branch of the Chabad-Lubavitch movement.

Tenants
 American Eagle Outfitters
 Asian Chao
 AT&T
 Auntie Anne’s Pretzels
 Bath & Body Works
 BJ’s Brewhouse
 Chick-fil-A
 Claire’s
 Dick’s Sporting Goods
 Dillard’s
 Express Factory
 Foot Locker
 Francesca’s
 GNC
 H & M
 H & R Block
 Hollister Co.
 Hot Topic
 JCPenney
 Journeys
 Macy’s
 Merle Norman Cosmetics Studio
 Outback Steakhouse
 Pandora
 Rack Room Shoes
 Rue21
 Spencer Gifts
 Starbucks
 Sunglass Hut
 The Children’s Place
 The Copper Closet
 Tilly’s
 T-Mobile
 Victoria’s Secret
 Yankee Candle
 Zales Jewelers

Incidents
On January 17, 2015, one person was killed and one was wounded in a shooting inside the mall food court before the gunman José Garcia Rodriguez committed suicide. The event was believed to be a domestic violence-related incident.

On December 13, 2016, a gun was fired during an attempted robbery in the mall’s parking lot.

References

External links
Official website

Buildings and structures in Melbourne, Florida
Tourist attractions in Brevard County, Florida
Washington Prime Group
Shopping malls in Florida
Shopping malls established in 1982
1982 establishments in Florida